Shaurya Sanandia (born 24 April 1987) is an Indian cricketer who plays for Saurashtra. He made his Twenty20 debut on 2 January 2016 in the 2015–16 Syed Mushtaq Ali Trophy.

References

External links
 

1987 births
Living people
Indian cricketers
Saurashtra cricketers
People from Rajkot